Fiberglass (American English) or fibreglass (Commonwealth English) is a common type of fiber-reinforced plastic using glass fiber. The fibers may be randomly arranged, flattened into a sheet called a chopped strand mat, or woven into glass cloth. The plastic matrix may be a thermoset polymer matrix—most often based on thermosetting polymers such as epoxy, polyester resin, or vinyl ester resin—or a thermoplastic.

Cheaper and more flexible than carbon fiber, it is stronger than many metals by weight, non-magnetic, non-conductive, transparent to electromagnetic radiation, can be molded into complex shapes, and is chemically inert under many circumstances. Applications include aircraft, boats, automobiles, bath tubs and enclosures, swimming pools, hot tubs, septic tanks, water tanks, roofing, pipes, cladding, orthopedic casts, surfboards, and external door skins.

Other common names for fiberglass are glass-reinforced plastic (GRP), glass-fiber reinforced plastic (GFRP) or GFK (from ). Because glass fiber itself is sometimes referred to as "fiberglass", the composite is also called fiberglass-reinforced plastic (FRP). This article will adopt the convention that "fiberglass" refers to the complete fiber-reinforced composite material, rather than only to the glass fiber within it.

Carbon-fiber-reinforced polymers are a similar composite material in which the reinforcement are carbon fibers.

History 
Glass fibers have been produced for centuries, but the earliest patent was awarded to the Prussian inventor Hermann Hammesfahr (1845–1914) in the U.S. in 1880.

Mass production of glass strands was accidentally discovered in 1932 when Games Slayter, a researcher at Owens-Illinois, directed a jet of compressed air at a stream of molten glass and produced fibers. A patent for this method of producing glass wool was first applied for in 1933. Owens joined with the Corning company in 1935 and the method was adapted by Owens Corning to produce its patented "Fiberglas" (spelled with one "s") in 1936. Originally, Fiberglas was a glass wool with fibers entrapping a great deal of gas, making it useful as an insulator, especially at high temperatures.

A suitable resin for combining the fiberglass with a plastic to produce a composite material was developed in 1936 by DuPont. The first ancestor of modern polyester resins is Cyanamid's resin of 1942. Peroxide curing systems were used by then. With the combination of fiberglass and resin the gas content of the material was replaced by plastic. This reduced the insulation properties to values typical of the plastic, but now for the first time, the composite showed great strength and promise as a structural and building material. Many glass fiber composites continued to be called "fiberglass" (as a generic name) and the name was also used for the low-density glass wool product containing gas instead of plastic.

Ray Greene of Owens Corning is credited with producing the first composite boat in 1937 but did not proceed further at the time due to the brittle nature of the plastic used. In 1939 Russia was reported to have constructed a passenger boat of plastic materials, and the United States a fuselage and wings of an aircraft. The first car to have a fiber-glass body was a 1946 prototype of the Stout Scarab, but the model did not enter production.

Fiber

Unlike glass fibers used for insulation, for the final structure to be strong, the fiber's surfaces must be almost entirely free of defects, as this permits the fibers to reach gigapascal tensile strengths. If a bulk piece of glass were defect-free, it would be equally as strong as glass fibers; however, it is generally impractical to produce and maintain bulk material in a defect-free state outside of laboratory conditions.

Production 
The process of manufacturing fiberglass is called pultrusion. The manufacturing process for glass fibers suitable for reinforcement uses large furnaces to gradually melt the silica sand, limestone, kaolin clay, fluorspar, colemanite, dolomite and other minerals until a liquid forms. It is then extruded through bushings (spinneret), which are bundles of very small orifices (typically 5–25 micrometres in diameter for E-Glass, 9 micrometres for S-Glass).

These filaments are then sized (coated) with a chemical solution. The individual filaments are now bundled in large numbers to provide a roving. The diameter of the filaments, and the number of filaments in the roving, determine its weight, typically expressed in one of two measurement systems:
yield, or yards per pound (the number of yards of fiber in one pound of material; thus a smaller number means a heavier roving). Examples of standard yields are 225yield, 450yield, 675yield.
tex, or grams per km (how many grams 1 km of roving weighs, inverted from yield; thus a smaller number means a lighter roving). Examples of standard tex are 750tex, 1100tex, 2200tex.

These rovings are then either used directly in a composite application such as pultrusion, filament winding (pipe), gun roving (where an automated gun chops the glass into short lengths and drops it into a jet of resin, projected onto the surface of a mold), or in an intermediary step, to manufacture fabrics such as chopped strand mat (CSM) (made of randomly oriented small cut lengths of fiber all bonded together), woven fabrics, knit fabrics or unidirectional fabrics.

Chopped strand mat
Chopped strand mat or CSM is a form of reinforcement used in fiberglass. It consists of glass fibers laid randomly across each other and held together by a binder.

It is typically processed using the hand lay-up technique, where sheets of material are placed on a mold and brushed with resin. Because the binder dissolves in resin, the material easily conforms to different shapes when wetted out. After the resin cures, the hardened product can be taken from the mold and finished.

Using chopped strand mat gives the fiberglass isotropic in-plane material properties.

Sizing
A coating or primer is applied to the roving to:
 help protect the glass filaments for processing and manipulation.
 ensure proper bonding to the resin matrix, thus allowing for the transfer of shear loads from the glass fibers to the thermoset plastic. Without this bonding, the fibers can 'slip' in the matrix causing localized failure.

Properties
An individual structural glass fiber is both stiff and strong in tension and compression—that is, along its axis. Although it might be assumed that the fiber is weak in compression, it is actually only the long aspect ratio of the fiber which makes it seem so; i.e., because a typical fiber is long and narrow, it buckles easily. On the other hand, the glass fiber is weak in shear—that is, across its axis. Therefore, if a collection of fibers can be arranged permanently in a preferred direction within a material, and if they can be prevented from buckling in compression, the material will be preferentially strong in that direction.

Furthermore, by laying multiple layers of fiber on top of one another, with each layer oriented in various preferred directions, the material's overall stiffness and strength can be efficiently controlled. In fiberglass, it is the plastic matrix which permanently constrains the structural glass fibers to directions chosen by the designer. With chopped strand mat, this directionality is essentially an entire two-dimensional plane; with woven fabrics or unidirectional layers, directionality of stiffness and strength can be more precisely controlled within the plane.

A fiberglass component is typically of a thin "shell" construction, sometimes filled on the inside with structural foam, as in the case of surfboards. The component may be of nearly arbitrary shape, limited only by the complexity and tolerances of the mold used for manufacturing the shell.

The mechanical functionality of materials is heavily reliant on the combined performances of both the resin (AKA matrix) and fibers. For example, in severe temperature conditions (over 180 °C), the resin component of the composite may lose its functionality, partially due to bond deterioration of resin and fiber. However, GFRPs can still show  significant residual strength after experiencing high temperatures (200 °C).

Types of glass fiber used 

The most common types of glass fiber used in fiberglass is E-glass, which is alumino-borosilicate glass with less than 1% w/w alkali oxides, mainly used for glass-reinforced plastics. Other types of glass used are A-glass (Alkali-lime glass with little or no boron oxide), E-CR-glass (Electrical/Chemical Resistance; alumino-lime silicate with less than 1% w/w alkali oxides, with high acid resistance), C-glass (alkali-lime glass with high boron oxide content, used for glass staple fibers and insulation), D-glass (borosilicate glass, named for its low Dielectric constant), R-glass (alumino silicate glass without MgO and CaO with high mechanical requirements as Reinforcement), and S-glass (alumino silicate glass without CaO but with high MgO content with high tensile strength).

Pure silica (silicon dioxide), when cooled as fused quartz into a glass with no true melting point, can be used as a glass fiber for fiberglass but has the drawback that it must be worked at very high temperatures. In order to lower the necessary work temperature, other materials are introduced as "fluxing agents" (i.e., components to lower the melting point). Ordinary A-glass ("A" for "alkali-lime") or soda lime glass, crushed and ready to be remelted, as so-called cullet glass, was the first type of glass used for fiberglass. E-glass ("E" because of initial Electrical application), is alkali-free and was the first glass formulation used for continuous filament formation. It now makes up most of the fiberglass production in the world, and also is the single largest consumer of boron minerals globally. It is susceptible to chloride ion attack and is a poor choice for marine applications. S-glass ("S" for "stiff") is used when tensile strength (high modulus) is important and is thus an important building and aircraft epoxy composite (it is called R-glass, "R" for "reinforcement" in Europe). C-glass ("C" for "chemical resistance") and T-glass ("T" is for "thermal insulator"—a North American variant of C-glass) are resistant to chemical attack; both are often found in insulation-grades of blown fiberglass.

Table of some common fiberglass types

Applications

Fiberglass is an immensely versatile material due to its lightweight, inherent strength, weather-resistant finish and variety of surface textures.

The development of fiber-reinforced plastic for commercial use was extensively researched in the 1930s. It was of particular interest to the aviation industry. A means of mass production of glass strands was accidentally discovered in 1932 when a researcher at Owens-Illinois directed a jet of compressed air at a stream of molten glass and produced fibers. After Owens merged with the Corning company in 1935, Owens Corning adapted the method to produce its patented "Fiberglas" (one "s"). A suitable resin for combining the "Fiberglas" with a plastic was developed in 1936 by DuPont. The first ancestor of modern polyester resins is Cyanamid's of 1942. Peroxide curing systems were used by then.

During World War II, fiberglass was developed as a replacement for the molded plywood used in aircraft radomes (fiberglass being transparent to microwaves). Its first main civilian application was for the building of boats and sports car bodies, where it gained acceptance in the 1950s. Its use has broadened to the automotive and sport equipment sectors. In the production of some products, such as aircraft, carbon fiber is now used instead of fiberglass, which is stronger by volume and weight.

Advanced manufacturing techniques such as pre-pregs and fiber rovings extend fiberglass's applications and the tensile strength possible with fiber-reinforced plastics.

Fiberglass is also used in the telecommunications industry for shrouding antennas, due to its RF permeability and low signal attenuation properties. It may also be used to conceal other equipment where no signal permeability is required, such as equipment cabinets and steel support structures, due to the ease with which it can be molded and painted to blend with existing structures and surfaces. Other uses include sheet-form electrical insulators and structural components commonly found in power-industry products. Because of fiberglass's lightweight and durability, it is often used in protective equipment such as helmets. Many sports use fiberglass protective gear, such as goaltenders' and catchers' masks.

Storage tanks

Storage tanks can be made of fiberglass with capacities up to about 300 tonnes. Smaller tanks can be made with chopped strand mat cast over a thermoplastic inner tank which acts as a preform during construction. Much more reliable tanks are made using woven mat or filament wound fiber, with the fiber orientation at right angles to the hoop stress imposed in the sidewall by the contents. Such tanks tend to be used for chemical storage because the plastic liner (often polypropylene) is resistant to a wide range of corrosive chemicals. Fiberglass is also used for septic tanks.

House building

Glass-reinforced plastics are also used to produce house building components such as roofing laminate, door surrounds, over-door canopies, window canopies and dormers, chimneys, coping systems, and heads with keystones and sills. The material's reduced weight and easier handling, compared to wood or metal, allows faster installation. Mass-produced fiberglass brick-effect panels can be used in the construction of composite housing, and can include insulation to reduce heat loss.

Oil and gas artificial lift systems
In rod pumping applications, fiberglass rods are often used for their high tensile strength to weight ratio. Fiberglass rods provide an advantage over steel rods because they stretch more elastically (lower Young's modulus) than steel for a given weight, meaning more oil can be lifted from the hydrocarbon reservoir to the surface with each stroke, all while reducing the load on the pumping unit.

Fiberglass rods must be kept in tension, however, as they frequently part if placed in even a small amount of compression. The buoyancy of the rods within a fluid amplifies this tendency.

Piping
GRP and GRE pipe can be used in a variety of above- and below-ground systems, including those for:
 desalination
 water treatment
 water distribution networks
 chemical process plants
 water used for firefighting
 hot and cold water
 drinking water
 wastewater/sewage, Municipal waste
 liquified petroleum gas

Examples of fiberglass use

 DIY bows / youth recurve; longbows
 Fiberglass Boats
 Pole vaulting poles
Equipment handles(Hammers, axes, etc.)
 Traffic lights
 Ship hulls
 Rowing shells and oars
 Waterpipes
 Helicopter rotor blades
 Surfboards, tent poles
 Gliders, kit cars, dune buggies, microcars, karts, bodyshells, kayaks, flat roofs, lorries
 Pods, domes and architectural features where a light weight is necessary
 Auto body parts, and entire auto bodies (e.g. Sabre Sprint, Lotus Elan, Anadol, Reliant, Quantum Coupé, Saab Sonett, Chevrolet Corvette, Studebaker Avanti, and DMC DeLorean underbody)
 Antenna covers and structures, such as radomes, UHF broadcasting antennas, and pipes used in hex beam antennas for amateur radio communications
 FRP tanks and vessels: FRP is used extensively to manufacture chemical equipment and tanks and vessels. BS4994 is a British standard related to this application.
 Most commercial velomobiles
 Most printed circuit boards consist of alternating layers of copper and fiberglass FR-4
 Large commercial wind turbine blades
 RF coils used in MRI scanners
 Drum Sets
 Sub-sea installation protection covers
 Reinforcement of asphalt pavement, as a fabric or mesh interlayer between lifts
 Helmets and other protective gear used in various sports
 Orthopedic casts
 Fiberglass grating is used for walkways on ships and oil rigs, and in factories
Fiberglass Profiles for structural use
 Fiber-reinforced composite columns
 Water slides
sculpture making
Fish ponds or lining cinder block fish ponds.
Insulating sheds or summerhouses

Construction methods

Filament winding
Filament winding is a fabrication technique mainly used for manufacturing open (cylinders) or closed-end structures (pressure vessels or tanks). The process involves winding filaments under tension over a male mandrel. The mandrel rotates while a wind eye on a carriage moves horizontally, laying down fibers in the desired pattern. The most common filaments are carbon or glass fiber and are coated with synthetic resin as they are wound. Once the mandrel is completely covered to the desired thickness, the resin is cured; often the mandrel is placed in an oven to achieve this, though sometimes radiant heaters are used with the mandrel still turning in the machine. Once the resin has cured, the mandrel is removed, leaving the hollow final product. For some products such as gas bottles, the 'mandrel' is a permanent part of the finished product forming a liner to prevent gas leakage or as a barrier to protect the composite from the fluid to be stored.

Filament winding is well suited to automation, and there are many applications, such as pipe and small pressure vessels that are wound and cured without any human intervention. The controlled variables for winding are fiber type, resin content, wind angle, tow or bandwidth and thickness of the fiber bundle. The angle at which the fiber has an effect on the properties of the final product. A high angle "hoop" will provide circumferential or "burst" strength, while lower angle patterns (polar or helical) will provide greater longitudinal tensile strength.

Products currently being produced using this technique range from pipes, golf clubs, Reverse Osmosis Membrane Housings, oars, bicycle forks, bicycle rims, power and transmission poles, pressure vessels to missile casings, aircraft fuselages and lamp posts and yacht masts.

Fiberglass hand lay-up operation

A release agent, usually in either wax or liquid form, is applied to the chosen mold to allow the finished product to be cleanly removed from the mold. Resin—typically a 2-part thermoset polyester, vinyl, or epoxy—is mixed with its hardener and applied to the surface. Sheets of fiberglass matting are laid into the mold, then more resin mixture is added using a brush or roller. The material must conform to the mold, and air must not be trapped between the fiberglass and the mold. Additional resin is applied and possibly additional sheets of fiberglass. Hand pressure, vacuum or rollers are used to be sure the resin saturates and fully wets all layers, and that any air pockets are removed. The work must be done quickly before the resin starts to cure unless high-temperature resins are used which will not cure until the part is warmed in an oven. In some cases, the work is covered with plastic sheets and vacuum is drawn on the work to remove air bubbles and press the fiberglass to the shape of the mold.

Fiberglass spray lay-up operation
The fiberglass spray lay-up process is similar to the hand lay-up process but differs in the application of the fiber and resin to the mold. Spray-up is an open-molding composites fabrication process where resin and reinforcements are sprayed onto a mold. The resin and glass may be applied separately or simultaneously "chopped" in a combined stream from a chopper gun. Workers roll out the spray-up to compact the laminate. Wood, foam or other core material may then be added, and a secondary spray-up layer imbeds the core between the laminates. The part is then cured, cooled, and removed from the reusable mold.

Pultrusion operation

Pultrusion is a manufacturing method used to make strong, lightweight composite materials. In pultrusion, material is pulled through forming machinery using either a hand-over-hand method or a continuous-roller method (as opposed to extrusion, where the material is pushed through dies).
In fiberglass pultrusion, fibers (the glass material) are pulled from spools through a device that coats them with a resin. They are then typically heat-treated and cut to length. Fiberglass produced this way can be made in a variety of shapes and cross-sections, such as W or S cross-sections.

Warping
One notable feature of fiberglass is that the resins used are subject to contraction during the curing process. For polyester this contraction is often 5–6%; for epoxy, about 2%. Because the fibers do not contract, this differential can create changes in the shape of the part during curing. Distortions can appear hours, days, or weeks after the resin has set.

While this distortion can be minimised by symmetric use of the fibers in the design, a certain amount of internal stress is created; and if it becomes too great, cracks form.

Health hazards 

In June 2011, the US National Toxicology Program (NTP) removed from its Report on Carcinogens all biosoluble glass wool used in home and building insulation and for non-insulation products. However, NTP considers fibrous glass dust to be "reasonably anticipated [as] a human carcinogen (Certain Glass Wool Fibers (Inhalable))". Similarly, California's Office of Environmental Health Hazard Assessment ("OEHHA") published a November, 2011 modification to its Proposition 65 listing to include only "Glass wool fibers (inhalable and biopersistent)." The actions of U.S. NTP and California's OEHHA mean that a cancer warning label for biosoluble fiber glass home and building insulation is no longer required under federal or California law. All fiberglass wools commonly used for thermal and acoustical insulation were reclassified by the International Agency for Research on Cancer (IARC) in October 2001 as Not Classifiable as to carcinogenicity to humans (Group 3).

People can be exposed to fiberglass in the workplace by breathing it in, skin contact, or eye contact. The Occupational Safety and Health Administration (OSHA) has set the legal limit (permissible exposure limit) for fiberglass exposure in the workplace as 15 mg/m3 total and 5 mg/m3 in respiratory exposure over an 8-hour workday. The National Institute for Occupational Safety and Health (NIOSH) has set a recommended exposure limit (REL) of 3 fibers/cm3 (less than 3.5 micrometers in diameter and greater than 10 micrometers in length) as a time-weighted average over an 8-hour workday, and a 5 mg/m3 total limit.

The European Union and Germany classify synthetic vitreous fibers as possibly or probably carcinogenic, but fibers can be exempt from this classification if they pass specific tests. Evidence for these classifications is primarily from studies on experimental animals and mechanisms of carcinogenesis. The glass wool epidemiology studies have been reviewed by a panel of international experts convened by the IARC. These experts concluded: "Epidemiologic studies published during the 15 years since the previous IARC monographs review of these fibers in 1988 provide no evidence of increased risks of lung cancer or mesothelioma (cancer of the lining of the body cavities) from occupational exposures during the manufacture of these materials, and inadequate evidence overall of any cancer risk." A 2012 health hazard review for the European Commission stated that inhalation of fiberglass at concentrations of 3, 16 and 30 mg/m3 "did not induce fibrosis nor tumours except transient lung inflammation that disappeared after a post-exposure recovery period." Similar reviews of the epidemiology studies have been conducted by the Agency for Toxic Substances and Disease Registry ("ATSDR"), the National Toxicology Program, the National Academy of Sciences and Harvard's Medical and Public Health Schools which reached the same conclusion as IARC that there is no evidence of increased risk from occupational exposure to glass wool fibers.

Fiberglass will irritate the eyes, skin, and the respiratory system. Potential symptoms include irritation of eyes, skin, nose, throat, dyspnea (breathing difficulty); sore throat, hoarseness and cough. Scientific evidence demonstrates that fiberglass is safe to manufacture, install and use when recommended work practices are followed to reduce temporary mechanical irritation. Unfortunately these work practices are not always followed, and fiberglass is often left exposed in basements that later become occupied. Fiberglass insulation should never be left exposed in an occupied area, according to the American Lung Association.

While the resins are cured, styrene vapors are released. These are irritating to mucous membranes and respiratory tract. Therefore, the Hazardous Substances Ordinance in Germany dictates a maximum occupational exposure limit of 86 mg/m3. In certain concentrations, a potentially explosive mixture may occur. Further manufacture of GRP components (grinding, cutting, sawing) creates fine dust and chips containing glass filaments, as well as tacky dust, in quantities high enough to affect health and the functionality of machines and equipment. The installation of effective extraction and filtration equipment is required to ensure safety and efficiency.

See also
 Bulk moulding compound
 Fiberglass sheet laminating
 G10 (material)
 Glass fiber reinforced concrete
 Hobas
 Ignace Dubus-Bonnel
 Sheet moulding compound

References

External links
 

 
American inventions
Composite materials
Fibre-reinforced polymers
Glass applications